Jeffrey Carl "Jeff" Rona (born March 3, 1957) is an American composer for film. He was a member of Hans Zimmer's MediaVentures. His credits include Sharkwater, Traffic, God of War III, Phantom and Veeram.
Jeff Rona was the founder and past president of MMA, the MIDI Manufacturers Association

Early life and education

Jeff Rona was born Culver City, California, the son of European immigrants.

He studied music, art and photography, but he left school to pursue music as his life's work.

Career

Rona is a contemporary film composer, recording artist, and performer. He has worked around the world, using both traditional musicians and modern technologies. He began composing for dance, theater, galleries and contemporary concert venues. Eventually he became an in-demand studio musician, arranger, ethnic woodwind player, sound designer, synthesist and music programmer in Los Angeles and New York City.

He worked on films and records before landing his first solo composing project, scoring the TV drama series Homicide: Life On The Street for director Barry Levinson. Since then he has scored a number of other films and television projects with directors such as Ridley Scott, Steven Spielberg, Wong Kar-wai, Robert Altman, Steven Soderbergh, Mark Pellington, Stephen Hopkins, Jonathan Demme, Frank Darabont and many others. He was commissioned to compose a concert for the 2008 Beijing Olympics which toured China.

Among his album projects, Rona recorded and performed as a member of Jon Hassell’s group, during which he co-composed and produced City-Works Of Fiction, a record for Opal Records (now on Rykodisc). The group toured and performed with producer/composer Brian Eno. Rona has performed with the Eastern fusion ensemble Axiom of Choice and appears on their Narada records. His music is on the Transplanet series on Triloka Records, the electronica compilation "Leaves From The Tree", and "Elysium For the Brave" (by Persian singer Azam Ali).

Rona has been chronicling his experiences in the film music world over the past several years in his column The Reel World in Keyboard Magazine. The column is also the basis of his book on film music.

Awards and honors

Rona's projects have received an Oscar, Peabody and Emmy awards, as well as film festival awards around the world. He is a two-time recipient of the ASCAP film and television music award.

Film and game scores

Television series scores and music

Interviews
 Interview with 8dio
 Interview with Film and Game Composers
 Interview with Film Music Magazine
 Interview with TrackSounds!
 Interview with Sound Design Junkies
Interview NAMM Oral History Program

External links
 The Official Jeff Rona Website
 

Living people
American film score composers
American male film score composers
1957 births
Varèse Sarabande Records artists